Albert Edward Gardner (April 1887 – April 1923) was an English professional footballer who played as a wing half. Gardner, who was profoundly deaf, was spotted by Birmingham playing for BSA Sports in the Birmingham Works League. He went on to make 120 appearances in all competitions for Birmingham in eleven years. Gardner died in Birmingham in April 1923; his death, at the age of 36, was registered in the Kings Norton district, which covered much of south Birmingham.

References

1887 births
Footballers from Birmingham, West Midlands
1923 deaths
English footballers
Association football wing halves
Birmingham City F.C. players
English Football League players
Deaf association football players
Date of birth missing
Date of death missing
English deaf people